PWH may refer to:

 Pee-wee Herman, a comic fictional character created and portrayed by Paul Reubens
 Prince of Wales Hospital, Shatin, Hong Kong, China
 Prince of Wales Hospital, Sydney, New South Wales, Australia
 Prince of Wales Hospital, now David Hare Block, a part of Medical College Kolkata, India